Bilcisha is a populated area in the southwestern Gedo region of Somalia.

References
Bilcisha

Populated places in Gedo